The Dhuldhoya are a Muslim community found in the state of Gujarat in India.

History and origin 

The community get their name Dhuldhoya from the Hindi word dhul-dhone ka kam or straining dust and separating gold particles. They claim to be a community of Shaikh Muslims who emigrated from Mawasa in Kota District of Rajasthan to different parts of Gujarat. The community is found mainly in Baroda and Sabarkantha districts. They now speak Gujarati.

Present circumstances 

The Dhuldoya community are strictly endogamous, marrying close kin. They practice both parallel cousin and cross cousin marriages. There are no sub-divisions in the community. The Dhuldhoya are a landless community, and with the decline in their traditional occupation, many are now wage labourers. A small number are now petty businessmen, involved mainly in the retail trade. They have an informal caste association, the Dhuldhoya Jamat, which deals with community welfare. The Dhuldhoya are Sunni, and have customs similar to other urban Muslim communities, such as the Mansoori and Ghanchi.

See also
Muslim Kadia

References 

Social groups of Gujarat
Muslim communities of India
Muslim communities of Gujarat